Johann Weiß may refer to:

 Johann Weiß (footballer) (born 1997), German footballer
 Johann Baptist Weiß (priest) (1753–1800), Benedictine priest, teacher and playwright
 Johann Baptist Weiss (1820–1899), German historian
 Johann Baptist Weiß (1814–1850), Austrian schoolmaster, organist and early tutor of Anton Bruckner
 Johann Jacob Weiss (c. 1662–1754), composer of lute music
 Johann Sigismund Weiss, the originally attributed composer of Flute sonata in D major (HWV 378) (c. 1707)
 Johann Weiss, see Pirate Party of Canada
 Johann Weiss, Viennese lawyer and WW1 veteran, executed by Eduard Roschmann